is a Japanese actress. She won the Best Actress award at the 32nd Japan Academy Prize for All Around Us.

Biography
Kimura starred in Ryosuke Hashiguchi's All Around Us. Her performance in the film was described by Jason Gray as "one of the most accurate portrayals of someone suffering from depression I've ever seen."

She co-starred in Isshin Inudo's Zero Focus with Miki Nakatani and Ryōko Hirosue, and starred in Makoto Shinozaki's Tokyo Island.

She appeared in Miwa Nishikawa's Dreams for Sale.

Filmography

Films
Hana and Alice (2004)
Infection (2004) – 2nd nurse
All About My Dog (2005)
Densha Otoko (2005)
Oh! Oku (2006)
Kaidan (2007)All Around Us (2008)Shizumanu Taiyō (2009)Zero Focus (2009)Tokyo Island (2010)Yoake no Machi de (2011)Dreams for Sale (2012)Monsterz (2014)The Case of Hana & Alice (2015)Have a Song on Your Lips (2015)Gold Medal Man (2016)Kōfuku no Alibi (2016)Cat Collector's House (2017)Yurigokoro (2017)Bōkyō (2017) – SayokoGood-Bye (2020) – Shizue TajimaNot Quite Dead Yet (2020)The Supporting Actors: The Movie (2021) – HerselfYour Turn to Kill: The Movie (2021)Cottontail (2022) – AkikoPrior Convictions (2022) – Emma Miyaguchi

TelevisionRing: The Final Chapter (1999)Unfair (2006)Masshiro (2015)Daddy Sister (2016), Kimiko KohashiYour Turn to Kill (2019)24 Japan (2020), Rikka Shidō
 House of Ninjas'' (2024), Yoko Tawara

References

External links
 Official website 
 
 

Japanese actresses
1971 births
Living people
People from Tokyo